2019 Irish elections may refer to:

Republic of Ireland
2019 Irish local elections
2019 European Parliament election in Ireland

Northern Ireland
2019 Northern Ireland local elections